Lionel M. Barnes MCP was a member of the colonial parliament of Bermuda for the United Bermuda Party for the constituency of Paget West.

References 

United Bermuda Party politicians
Year of birth missing
Year of death missing